Big Star (Korean: 빅스타, often stylized as BIGSTAR) was a South Korean boy band formed in 2012. The group consists of Feeldog, Baram, Raehwan, Sunghak and Jude. Big Star was signed to Brave Entertainment.
On July 1, 2019 Brave Entertainment announced that Big Star have disbanded after the members contracts expired.

History 
Big Star released their first single, Bigstart, on July 12, 2012.

In 2014, Big Star became the first idol group to hold 100 concerts in Japan.

On June 27, 2017, Brave Entertainment confirmed that Bora and Feeldog had been officially dating for about six months after meeting each other on Hit the Stage.

In October 2017, Big Star appeared in the KBS survival show, Idol Rebooting Project: The Unit. On February 10, 2018, Feeldog came in 4th place on The Unit, making him an official member and leader of the show's group, UNB.

In July 2019, the group disbanded following the expiration of members' contracts.

Former Members
 Baram (바람)
 Raehwan (래환)
 Feeldog (필독)
 Sunghak (성학)
 Jude (주드)

Discography

Extended plays

Single albums

Singles

As lead artist

As featured artist

Compilation appearances

References

External links

K-pop music groups
South Korean boy bands
South Korean dance music groups
South Korean pop music groups
Brave Entertainment artists